Liam Johnson Hendriks (born 10 February 1989), nicknamed "Slydah", is an Australian professional baseball pitcher for the Chicago White Sox of Major League Baseball (MLB). He previously played for the Minnesota Twins, Kansas City Royals, Toronto Blue Jays and Oakland Athletics. He has been an All-Star three times (2019, 2021 and 2022) and was the American League's Reliever of the Year in 2020 and 2021.

Background
Born and raised in Perth, Western Australia, Hendriks began playing tee-ball when he was five (rather than the traditional Australian summer game of cricket), before transitioning to baseball at the age of ten. He also played Australian rules football. Hendriks continued playing both baseball and football through high school at Sacred Heart College, Sorrento.

Hendriks's paternal grandparents emigrated to Australia from the Netherlands.  His father, Geoff Hendriks, played over 150 games of senior football for the West Perth Football Club in the West Australian Football League (WAFL). Under the father–son rule used by the Australian Football League (AFL) at the time, Liam was eligible to be drafted by the West Coast Eagles had he decided to pursue a career in football. However, he decided to pursue baseball and was signed by the Minnesota Twins on his eighteenth birthday.

In 2017 and 2019, Hendriks was the Oakland Athletics' nominee for the Roberto Clemente Award after his work with Big League Impact and Striking Out Poverty in their efforts to end poverty in the Dominican Republic.

Professional career

Minnesota Twins
Hendriks debuted in the Twins organization in 2007 pitching for the Gulf Coast League Twins. He led the team in strikeouts with 52. He was also named as a Twins Top 50 prospect. He pitched for the Perth Heat in the 2008 Claxton Shield and went 3–0 with a 1.90 earned run average (ERA) and 25 strikeouts, a competition high. Liam was then added to the Australian national team for the 2008 Final Olympic Qualification Tournament pitching five innings of work while only allowing one unearned run alongside two hits and a walk while striking out six. Hendriks underwent back surgery that prevented him from playing in the minors in the 2008 season, but made the 2009 World Baseball Classic roster, the youngest Australian player in the Classic.

In 2009, Hendriks spent the season with the Class-A Beloit Snappers of the Midwest League and the Rookie-Level Elizabethton Twins of the Appalachian League. He went a combined 5–5 with a 3.55 ERA in 14 games, all starts. Hendriks was selected for the 2010 All-Star Futures Game, but developed appendicitis and was forced to miss the game. Hendriks earned a Futures Game invitation in 2010. On 5 September 2011, Hendriks was called up to the Minnesota Twins from Triple-A Rochester. He went on to finish the season with an 0–2 record. At the end of the 2011 season he was named the Minnesota Twins' Minor League Pitcher of the Year. He was an All-Star for the New Britain Rock Cats in 2011, and named an organizational All-Star for Minnesota at the end of the season. He also earned his second invitation to the Futures Game.

After a successful spring training (3–1, 2.84 ERA, 8 games/4 starts), Hendriks was named as one of the Twins' starting pitchers for 2012. On 19 September 2012, Hendriks earned his first Major League victory in a 6–4 win against the Cleveland Indians. On 5 December 2013, the Twins designated Hendriks for assignment, after the signing of pitcher Phil Hughes.

Toronto Blue Jays
On 13 December 2013, Hendriks was claimed off waivers by the Chicago Cubs. Ten days later, he was claimed off waivers again, this time by the Baltimore Orioles. The Orioles designated him for assignment on 19 February 2014 to make room for Ubaldo Jiménez on the active roster. The Toronto Blue Jays claimed Hendriks off waivers on 21 February 2014. On 10 March 2014, he was optioned to the Triple-A Buffalo Bisons. Hendriks compiled a 5–0 record with an ERA of 1.46 through nine games (seven starts) with the Bisons, before being called up to the Majors on 23 May 2014. He made his Blue Jays debut that day, picking up a 3–2 win over the Oakland Athletics. Hendriks started the game and allowed 3 hits, 1 earned run, 3 walks and struck out 3 over 5 innings. After 2 starts for the Blue Jays, Hendriks was optioned back to Triple-A Buffalo on 1 June 2014. He posted a 1–0 record with a 2.31 ERA and 8 strikeouts in his 2 starts. Hendriks was called up on 20 June to start against the Cincinnati Reds, and was sent back down to Buffalo the following day after he pitched only 1 innings and surrendered 6 earned runs. Hendriks was named as the starter for the International League in the Triple-A All-Star Game after posting a 7–1 record with a 2.19 ERA in 16 starts. In being named the starter, he became only the fourth pitcher from the Bisons to start the All-Star Game. Hendriks was named the Top Star of the game.

Kansas City Royals
On 28 July 2014, Hendriks, along with Erik Kratz, was traded to the Kansas City Royals in exchange for Danny Valencia. He was recalled from the Omaha Storm Chasers on 27 August to make a start for the Royals against his former team, the Twins. He was designated for assignment on 24 October when Moises Sierra was claimed on waivers.

Second stint with the Blue Jays
On 30 October 2014, Hendriks was traded back to the Toronto Blue Jays for Santiago Nessy. Hendriks pitched exclusively out of the bullpen in 2015, and appeared in a career-high 58 games. He would pitch to a 5–0 record, 2.92 ERA, and 71 strikeouts in 64 innings. In the playoffs, Hendriks broke an 85-year-old record in Game Four of the 2015 American League Championship Series on 21 October 2015. After starter R. A. Dickey gave up five runs, Hendriks entered in as the long reliever and pitched 4.1 scoreless innings from the second to the sixth and finished with 13 outs from 12 batters faced, breaking the playoff record for more-outs-than-batters-faced performances. Jim Lindsey previously held the mark with eight outs from seven batters faced in 1930, while playing for the St. Louis Cardinals. Hendriks was pulled in the seventh inning in what was a criticized move and relievers LaTroy Hawkins and Ryan Tepera surrendered seven runs, and with the bullpen depleted at that point, position player Cliff Pennington pitched the final outs as the Blue Jays lost 14-2. For his record-breaking performance in the ALCS, Hendriks was named the Male Player of the Year by Baseball Australia, and a finalist for the Western Australian Sports Star of the Year.

Oakland Athletics
On 20 November 2015, the Blue Jays traded Hendriks to the Oakland Athletics for Jesse Chavez. Hendriks finished the 2016 season with a 3.76 ERA and 0–4 record, pitching  innings in 53 appearances. In 2017, he pitched 64 innings in 70 appearances with a 4–2 record and 4.22 ERA.

Hendriks was designated for assignment on 25 June 2018, and sent outright to Triple-A Nashville. He was called up to the major league club on 1 September 2018. During the regular season, Hendriks appeared in 25 games with Oakland, pitching 24 innings with a 0–1 record and 4.13 ERA. The Athletics used Hendriks as their opener in the 2018 American League Wild Card Game, becoming the first Australian born player ever to start an MLB postseason game.

In 2019, Hendriks took over as the Athletics' closer after an injury to Blake Treinen and made his first career All-Star Game, as a replacement for Charlie Morton. He also earned the inaugural All-MLB Second team honors. Hendriks enjoyed the best season of his career, finishing with a record of 4-4 with an ERA of 1.80 in 75 games, including 2 starts. He also recorded 25 saves while striking out 124 batters in 85 innings. In 2020, Hendriks continued his dominance from 2019, finishing with a 3-1 record with an ERA of 1.78 in 24 games. He recorded 14 saves and 37 strikeouts in   innings. In the postseason, Hendriks was 1-0 with a 3.18 ERA against the Chicago White Sox in the 2020 ALWCS & Houston Astros in the 2020 ALDS.

Chicago White Sox
On 11 January 2021, Hendriks signed a three year, $54 million deal with the Chicago White Sox, with a club option for a fourth year. Hendriks was named the AL Reliever of the Month for May and September; he previously received the award twice while with Oakland.

Hendriks earned the save in the 2021 All-Star Game at Coors Field in Denver, won 5-2 by the American League. Entering the game in the bottom of the ninth inning, Hendriks gave up two hits and struck out one, allowing no runs, all while he was being mic'd up by Fox, who were broadcasting the game.

On 12 August 2021, Hendriks was the first winning pitcher in Iowa during the Field of Dreams game despite blowing a save opportunity when the White Sox were up 7-4 in the top of the ninth. With two outs, Hendriks allowed four runs by giving up back-to-back, two-run home runs to New York Yankees batters Aaron Judge and Giancarlo Stanton to give the Yankees an 8-7 lead. Fortunately for Hendriks, he was still able to get the win due to  Tim Anderson hitting a two-run, walk-off home run to give the White Sox a 9-8 win. Overall in 2021, Hendriks appeared in 69 games while recording an American League-leading 38 saves and having a record of 8-3. He also had an ERA of 2.54 in 71 innings and led all MLB relievers in strikeouts with 113. Hendriks won the Mariano Rivera AL Reliever of the Year Award for the second year in a row, becoming the second White Sox pitcher in history to win Reliever of the Year, joining Bobby Thigpen. 

In 2022, Hendriks struggled to start the season. In the first game of the season against the Tigers with the White Sox up 4–3, Hendriks allowed a game-tying homerun to Eric Haase with one out in the bottom of the ninth, giving him a blown save. Hendriks then gave up a walk-off RBI single with two outs to Javier Baez, thus incurring the loss. Hendriks had an ERA of 5.40 in the month of April, but was able to turn it around as the season went on. But on 14 June, Hendriks would be placed on the IL with a right forearm strain. Hendriks came back on the Fourth of July and pitched his first game since 10 June on the same day against the Minnesota Twins, where he pitched in the eighth inning and struck out the side in 14 pitches. Hendriks made his third All-Star game appearance that season. He pitched a third of the eighth inning, inducing Atlanta Braves catcher Travis d'Arnaud to pop out to Seattle Mariners rookie center fielder Julio Rodríguez. Hendriks was also mic'd up by Fox, who were broadcasting the game, and was yelling at Rodríguez to throw the ball back to him, even with Rodríguez pretending to throw the ball to a fan in the stands before throwing the ball back to Hendriks. Overall, Hendriks had a 4–4 record in 58 games with an ERA of 2.81 in 57.2 innings while striking out 85 batters and made 37 saves.

International career

Claxton Shield
Hendriks pitched for the Perth Heat in the 2008 Claxton Shield and went 3–0 with a 1.90 ERA and 25 strikeouts, a competition high. He was named the Rookie of the Year for that season.

Australian Baseball League
Liam returned for the Heat in the inaugural season of the Australian Baseball League. After starting the season posting seven scoreless innings over three outings, Hendriks endured a rough second half, ending up 1-4 with a 6.49 ERA in eight total games. He is yet to return to his native league through the 2020-21 season.

World Baseball Classic
Hendriks underwent back surgery that prevented him from playing in the minors in the 2008 season, but made the 2009 World Baseball Classic roster, the youngest Australian player in the Classic.

On 9 February 2017, he was selected for the 2017 World Baseball Classic, but opted not to participate in the first round, where Australia were eventually knocked out.

Personal life
Hendriks married his wife Kristi in 2013. Through his wife, Hendriks became a Montreal Canadiens fan, saying in an interview with NHL Network in 2020 that he's "watched every game" and has "embraced the Habs lifestyle". He also supports North Melbourne Football Club.

On 8 January 2023, Hendriks announced that he had been diagnosed with non-Hodgkin lymphoma and was beginning treatment.

See also

 List of Major League Baseball players from Australia

References

External links

1989 births
Living people
American League All-Stars
Australian expatriate baseball players in Canada
Australian expatriate baseball players in the United States
Australian people of Dutch descent
Baseball people from Western Australia
Beloit Snappers players
Buffalo Bisons (minor league) players
Chicago White Sox players
Elizabethton Twins players
Fort Myers Miracle players
Gulf Coast Twins players
Kansas City Royals players
Major League Baseball players from Australia
Minnesota Twins players
Nashville Sounds players
National baseball team players
New Britain Rock Cats players
Oakland Athletics players
Omaha Storm Chasers players
Perth Heat players
Rochester Red Wings players
Sportspeople from Perth, Western Australia
Toronto Blue Jays players
2009 World Baseball Classic players
Australian expatriate baseball players in the Dominican Republic
Águilas Cibaeñas players